Macropodinae is a subfamily of marsupials in the family Macropodidae, which includes the kangaroos, wallabies, and related species. The subfamily includes about ten genera and at least 51 species. It includes all living members of the Macropodidae except for the banded hare-wallaby (Lagostrophus fasciatus), the only surviving member of the subfamily Lagostrophinae.

Macropodinae includes the following living genera:
 Dendrolagus (tree-kangaroos – 14 species)
 Dorcopsis (greater dorcopsises – 4 species)
 Dorcopsulus (lesser dorcopsises – 2 species)
 Lagorchestes (hare-wallabies – 4 species)
 Macropus (common kangaroos – 2 species)
 Notamacropus (brush wallabies - 7 species, one recently extinct)
 Onychogalea (nail-tail wallabies – 3 species)
 Osphranter (wallaroos and large kangaroos - 4 species)
 Petrogale (rock-wallabies – 17 species)
 Setonix (quokka)
 Thylogale (pademelons – 7 species)
 Wallabia (swamp wallaby)

Different common names are used for macropodines, including "wallaby" and "kangaroo", with the distinction sometimes based exclusively on size. In addition to the well-known kangaroos, the subfamily includes other specialized groups, such as the arboreal tree-kangaroos (Dendrolagus), which have body masses between 4 and 13 kg, and a relatively long prehensile tail.

References

Macropods
Mammal subfamilies